Margot at the Wedding is a 2007 American comedy-drama film written and directed by Noah Baumbach. It stars Nicole Kidman, Jennifer Jason Leigh, Jack Black, John Turturro, Ciarán Hinds and Halley Feiffer. The film is about the familial storm that arises when Margot, a writer, comes to visit her sister Pauline on the eve of her wedding.

The film premiered on August 31, 2007 at the 34th Telluride Film Festival and was released in the United States on December 7, 2007.

Plot
Margot is a successful but self-absorbed writer; it is suggested that she has borderline personality disorder. She brings her 11-year-old son Claude to spend a weekend visiting her free-spirited sister Pauline on the eve of her wedding to Malcolm at their home on Long Island, New York.

Margot disapproves of Pauline's choice of fiancé: Malcolm is an unsuccessful musician whom Margot considers "completely unattractive". While in town, Margot will be interviewed in a local bookstore by Dick Koosman, a successful author with whom she is collaborating on a screenplay. Dick's teenage daughter Maisy also visits the house.

Margot and Pauline have an uneasy relationship. Margot disapproves of Pauline's life-choices - besides marrying Malcolm, she is pregnant, a fact that she has not shared with Malcolm or her pre-teen daughter Ingrid. Pauline, meanwhile, resents Margot for writing and publishing thinly-disguised stories about her life. She is also incensed when Margot shares secrets told to her in confidence, including her pregnancy. Rather than confront each other, Pauline and Margot take out their frustrations on Malcolm and Claude, respectively.

Tensions come to a head twice. Margot's interview goes disastrously wrong when Dick's questions become personal. While Pauline interrogates him about emails he received from one of her 20-year-old students, Malcolm admits he kissed Maisy. Returning to the house, Pauline finds Maisy inside. Although she says nothing, it is obvious to Maisy that Pauline knows the truth. When Dick finds out what happened, he chases and beats Malcolm.

Margot and Pauline get into a heated argument, unleashing years of resentment. Following a climactic moment, the women leave with their children, leaving Malcolm behind. After the car runs off the road due to malfunctioning brakes, Pauline defecates in her skirt and removes her soiled underwear.

The next day, Pauline calls Malcolm, intent on breaking up with him. When he begs for forgiveness, she gives in and takes him back.

Margot decides to stay with her sister and puts Claude on a bus to Vermont so he can live with his father. As the bus pulls away with him, she has a change of heart and chases after it. Taking a seat next to a surprised Claude, Margot catches her breath.

Cast
 Nicole Kidman as Margot
 Jennifer Jason Leigh as Pauline
 Jack Black as Malcolm
 John Turturro as Jim
 Ciarán Hinds as Dick Koosman
 Halley Feiffer as Maisy Koosman
 Seth Barrish as Toby
 Michael Cullen as Mr. Volger
 Enid Graham as Mrs. Volger
 Zane Pais as Claude
 Flora Cross as Ingrid

Production
Noah Baumbach originally wanted to title the film Nicole at the Beach, in reference to French New Wave director Éric Rohmer's Pauline at the Beach. The title was changed when Nicole Kidman was cast. During filming, Kidman, Jennifer Jason Leigh, Zane Pais, and Jack Black lived in a house together in order to perfect the roles of a dysfunctional family.

Of her character Margot, Kidman said “I hope you see that the spikiness and the guardedness and the anger is actually a manifestation of her need to protect herself. She’s not in a safe place, really, because her sister doesn’t know how to take care of her, and she doesn’t know how to take care of her sister...They feel like they should be very, very close, but they actually do not bring out the best in each other."

Margot at the Wedding was shot from April–June 2006 in various locations in New York locations, including Shelter Island, Hampton Bays, East Quogue, Long Island and City Island, Bronx.

Soundtrack
Dean Wareham and Britta Phillips acted as the film's music consultants, and the film "features the more obscure singer-songwriters that Baumbach is obsessed with...like [1970s] post-Dylan folkie Steve Forbert, British singer-songwriter and occasional Pink Floyd guest Lesley Duncan, Brooklyn-born singer songwriter Evie Sands (covered both Beck and Beth Orton) and New York anti-folk artist Diane Cluck."

 "Northern Blue" by Dean Wareham & Britta Phillips
 "Romeo's Tune" by Steve Forbert
 "Go Tell Aunt Rhody" performed by Jack Black
 "Genesis" by Jorma Kaukonen
 "One Fine Summer Morning" performed by Evie Sands
 "Goin' Down to Laurel" by Steve Forbert
 "The Wagon" by Dinosaur Jr.
 "Dear Mary" by Steve Miller Band
 "See How We Are" performed by X
 "Sunday Girl" performed by Zane Pais
 "Everything Changes" by Lesley Duncan
 "Union City Blue" by Blondie
 "You and Me" by Alice Cooper
 "Clair" by Gilbert O'Sullivan
 "Easy to Be Around" by Diane Cluck
 "Nothing Is Wrong" performed by The dB's
 "That's All for Everyone" by Fleetwood Mac
 "On and On" performed by Michael Medeiros
 "Teen Angel" by Donovan
 "Something on Your Mind" performed by Karen Dalton

Release and reception
The film premiered August 31, 2007 at the 34th Telluride Film Festival. It was also shown at the Toronto International Film Festival, the New York Film Festival, and the Mill Valley Film Festival. The film opened in limited release in the United States on November 16, 2007. It opened in Australia on February 21, 2008 and in the United Kingdom on February 28, 2008.

The film grossed $2 million in the United States and Canada and a total of $2.9 million worldwide.

Critical response

Rotten Tomatoes gives the film an approval rating of 52% based on 168 reviews, with an average rating of 5.62/10. The website's critical consensus reads "Despite a great cast, the characters in Margot at the Wedding are too unlikable to enthrall viewers." Metacritic gives the film an average score of 66 out of 100, based on 37 reviews, indicating "generally favorable reviews".

A positive review in The Guardian in Britain compared the film to the director's previous film, stating: "Margot at the Wedding, (is) an intelligent, subtle new movie by American writer-director Noah Baumbach, who made a considerable impression three years ago with The Squid and the Whale, his first film to reach this country. The Squid was a witty, affecting and painfully truthful account of two teenagers reacting to the separation of their parents, both writers living in New York, the father a pompous novelist whose once considerable career is in freefall, the mother a writer whose reputation is rapidly rising. Margot at the Wedding, less sharply focused than its predecessor, explores similar territory in an equally allusive and indirect way."

Todd McCarthy of Variety wrote "Kidman is the rawest as the most dangerously neurotic and manipulative of the bunch, Leigh the most prone to mood swings, while Black, whose character is not yet a family insider — more luck to him — works in a mode of emotional opaqueness that itself may mask the man’s intense neuroses. Newcomer Pais is very good as the son who learns way too much too fast."

Accolades

References

External links

 Script
 
 
 
Margot at the Wedding: An Interview with Nicole Kidman at Blackfilm.com
Noah Baumbach on Margot at the Wedding at Salon

2007 films
2007 independent films
American comedy-drama films
Borderline personality disorder in fiction
Films directed by Noah Baumbach
Films about dysfunctional families
Films produced by Scott Rudin
Paramount Vantage films
Films about sisters
Films about writers
Films about mother–son relationships
2000s English-language films
2000s American films